Niue Airline was an airline in Niue, established in 1990. It serviced the Auckland-Niue route weekly, and later fortnightly, until its closure in 1992. The route was operated by a chartered Air Nauru 737 and carried mail. Flights were sometimes cancelled if passenger numbers or freight was not enough to fund the flight. The airline was majority New Zealand-owned (with some Niuean investment).

The airline's uniforms were designed by Dutch-New Zealand fashion designer Doris De Pont. Niue Airlines was not linked to any international booking system, and so tickets could only be purchased at ticket offices, one of which was located in Auckland. The IATA code of the airline was FN.

History
In October 1990, Niue Airlines flew twenty-three pupils (and their parents and teachers) to the island after discovering it had 40 vacant seats on a flight. The group from Three Kings Primary School in Auckland, whose travel was arranged at no cost, was greeted with garlands of flowers, appeared on local television, had a short swim in the ocean and were then farewelled by Premier Sir Robert Rex after a whirlwind trip.

In 1991, services were operated from Auckland to Niue, and returned via Tonga.

Towards the end of the airline's life, services were only operated between Pago Pago and Niue using a nine-seat Beechcraft King Air. Travelling from Auckland to Niue then required stopovers in Apia and Pago Pago. The airline ceased to operate in late 1992, when, after the Niuean government refused to provide bank guarantees for the purchase of aviation fuel, they defaulted on a fuel bill and their licence was cancelled.

See also
 List of defunct airlines of New Zealand
 History of aviation in New Zealand

References 

Defunct airlines of New Zealand
Companies of Niue
Airlines established in 1990
Airlines disestablished in 1992
New Zealand companies established in 1990
1992 disestablishments in New Zealand